Springfield Township School District is a public school district in Montgomery County, Pennsylvania, United States. The district serves parts of Springfield Township, including Oreland, Flourtown, Erdenheim, and Wyndmoor.

Schools 
 Springfield Elementary School, Enfield Campus (K-1)
 Springfield Elementary School, Erdenheim Campus (2-5)

 Springfield Middle School (6-8)

Springfield Township High School (9-12)

History 
Springfield Township School District was the first in Pennsylvania to adopt an official stance on the issue of access to bathrooms for transgender students. In April 2016, the school board unanimously approved a policy which states that students are allowed to use the bathrooms and locker rooms corresponding to their gender identity rather than the sex stated on their birth certificate.

Future plans
Springfield Township School District will be the first school district with a fully battery powered bus in the United States.

The Erdenheim Elementary School is currently being replaced with a brand new facility in the same area as the former campus. The middle school is also currently being remodeled; both will be equipped with new geothermal heating technology.

The district is also in the process of getting more smart board technology in all classrooms, across all schools.

References

External links
 

School districts in Montgomery County, Pennsylvania